Reza Naderian (born January 29, 1989, in Isfahan, Iran) is an Iranian Taekwondo athlete who competed in the Men's 58 kg at the 2008 Summer Olympics.

References

External links
 

Iranian male taekwondo practitioners
Olympic taekwondo practitioners of Iran
Taekwondo practitioners at the 2008 Summer Olympics
1989 births
Living people
Taekwondo practitioners at the 2010 Asian Games
Sportspeople from Isfahan
Asian Games competitors for Iran
World Taekwondo Championships medalists
Asian Taekwondo Championships medalists
20th-century Iranian people
21st-century Iranian people